In geometry, the snub triapeirogonal tiling is a uniform tiling of the hyperbolic plane with a Schläfli symbol of sr{∞,3}.

Images 
Drawn in chiral pairs, with edges missing between black triangles:

The dual tiling:

Related polyhedra and tiling 

This hyperbolic tiling is topologically related as a part of sequence of uniform snub polyhedra with vertex configurations (3.3.3.3.n), and [n,3] Coxeter group symmetry.

See also
List of uniform planar tilings
Tilings of regular polygons
Uniform tilings in hyperbolic plane

References

 John H. Conway, Heidi Burgiel, Chaim Goodman-Strass, The Symmetries of Things 2008,  (Chapter 19, The Hyperbolic Archimedean Tessellations)

External links 

Apeirogonal tilings
Chiral figures
Hyperbolic tilings
Isogonal tilings
Snub tilings
Uniform tilings